Michael Worrell (born 14 June 1958) is a Barbadian cricketer. He played in sixteen first-class and two List A matches for the Barbados cricket team from 1982 to 1987.

See also
 List of Barbadian representative cricketers

References

External links
 

1958 births
Living people
Barbadian cricketers
Barbados cricketers
People from Saint Peter, Barbados